RVD-Hpα (pepcan-12) is an endogenous neuropeptide found in human and mammalian brain, which was originally proposed to act as a selective agonist for the CB1 cannabinoid receptor. It is a 12-amino acid polypeptide having the amino acid sequence Arg-Val-Asp-Pro-Val-Asn-Phe-Lys-Leu-Leu-Ser-His and is an N-terminal extended form of hemopressin, a 9-AA polypeptide derived from the α1 subunit of hemoglobin which has previously been shown to act as a CB1 inverse agonist. All three polypeptides have been isolated from various mammalian species, with RVD-Hpα being one of the more abundant neuropeptides expressed in mouse brain, and these neuropeptides represent a new avenue for cannabinoid research distinct from the previously known endogenous lipid-derived cannabinoid agonists such as anandamide. Recently it was shown that RVD-Hpα (also called Pepcan-12) is a potent negative allosteric modulator at CB1 receptors, together with other newly described N-terminally extended peptides (pepcans).

Pepcan-12 is the major peptide of a family of endogenous peptide endocannabinoids (pepcans) shown to act as negative allosteric modulators (NAM) of cannabinoid CB1 receptors. It is shown that pepcan-12 opposite acts as a potent CB2 cannabinoid receptor positive allosteric modulator (PAM). This peptide is very specifically expressed in the noradrenergic neurons in the brain, mainly the locus coeruleus and its projections and in the adrenal medulla. RVD-Hpα also significantly potentiated the effects of CB2 receptor agonists, including the endocannabinoid 2-arachidonoyl glycerol (2-AG), for GTPγS binding and cAMP inhibition (5–10 fold). The putative precursor pepcan-23 was identified with pepcan-12 in brain, liver and kidney in mice,. RVD-Hpα was increased upon endotoxemia and ischemia reperfusion damage where CB2 receptors play a protective role. The wide occurrence of this endogenous hormone-like CB2 receptor PAM, with unforeseen opposite allosteric effects on cannabinoid receptors, suggests its potential role in peripheral pathophysiological processes.

References 

Neuropeptides
Endocannabinoids